EU or Ёлочные игрушки ("Christmas tree decorations") is a Russian electronic music group, generally considered to be part of the IDM genre, formed in 1997 in Saint Petersburg, and consisting of Sasha Zaitsev and Ilya Baramiya.

They have also worked with Stanislav Baretsky.

Partial discography
 Warm Math (Pause 2)
 Christmas Baubles and Their Strange Sounds (Lo Recordings)
 Tuner (Pause 2)
 Reframing (Pause 2)
 Электронщина (Electronschina) 2005

External links
 Pause 2 EU Biography
 Boomkat Discography

Intelligent dance musicians
Musical groups established in 1997
Russian musical groups
Russian electronic music groups